José Martins may refer to:

 José Martins (boxer) (born 1931), Brazilian Olympic boxer
 José Saraiva Martins (born 1932), Portuguese cardinal of the Roman Catholic Church
 José Gouveia Martins (1930–2015), Portuguese football half-back
 José Martins (footballer, born 1906), Portuguese football forward